Patricia Beatty,  (13 May 1936 – 20 November 2020) was a Canadian choreographer, dancer, director and teacher.

Early life and education
Patricia Beatty was born in Toronto. She studied modern dance at Bennington College in Bennington, Vermont and graduated in 1959. She studied at various schools in New York City, but most influential were José Limón and the Martha Graham School.

Career 
Viewed as a seminal figure within modern-dance performance in Canada, she notably co-founded the Toronto Dance Theatre in Toronto, Ontario with Peter Randazzo, in 1968.
In 2002 she also co-founded the Toronto Heritage Dance company.

Awards and honors 
She was named a Member of the Order of Canada in 2004.

References

1936 births
2020 deaths
20th-century Canadian educators
21st-century Canadian educators
Bennington College alumni
Canadian choreographers
Canadian expatriates in the United States
Canadian female dancers
Canadian directors
Canadian educators
Canadian founders
Martha Graham
Members of the Order of Canada
Modern dancers
People from Bennington, Vermont
People from New York City
People from Toronto
Canadian women choreographers